Annalisa Cucinotta (born 3 April 1986) is an Italian former professional road and track cyclist. She represented her nation at the 2015 UCI Track Cycling World Championships.

Major results

Track

2003
 2nd  Scratch, UEC European Junior Track Championships
2004
 UEC European Junior Track Championships
1st  Scratch
2nd  500m time trial
2nd  Sprint
 3rd  Scratch, 2004–05 UCI Track Cycling World Cup Classics, Moscow
2005
 1st  Scratch, 2004–05 UCI Track Cycling World Cup Classics, Sydney
2006
 1st  Scratch, 2006–07 UCI Track Cycling World Cup Classics, Moscow
2007
 2nd  Scratch, 2007–08 UCI Track Cycling World Cup Classics, Sydney
 2nd  Scratch, UEC European Under-23 Track Championships
2008
 2008–09 UCI Track Cycling World Cup Classics
1st  Scratch, Cali
2nd  Scratch, Melbourne
3rd  Team pursuit, Cali
2013
 1st Omnium, Copa Internacional de Pista
 3rd Omnium, International Belgian Open
2014
 1st Scratch, Revolution – Round 2, Manchester
 2nd Scratch, International Track Women & Men
 3rd Omnium, UIV Talents Cup Final
 3rd Omnium, International Belgian Open
2015
 1st Scratch, Prova Internacional de Anadia
 2nd  Elimination race, UEC European Track Championships
 3rd Points race, 3 Jours d'Aigle

Road

2006
 2nd GP Liberazione
2007
 3rd GP Liberazione
2008
 1st Classica Citta di Padova
 4th GP Liberazione
2011
 5th GP Liberazione
 9th GP Comune di Cornaredo
2014
 9th Tour of Chongming Island World Cup
 10th Overall Tour of Chongming Island
 10th Grand Prix de Dottignies
2015
 1st Stage 1 Ladies Tour of Qatar
 1st Stage 4 Giro d'Italia Femminile
 3rd Overall Tour of Chongming Island
 3rd RideLondon Grand Prix
 8th Tour of Chongming Island World Cup
2016
 4th Overall Tour of Chongming Island
2017
 5th Trofee Maarten Wynants

References

External links

1986 births
Italian female cyclists
Living people
People from Latisana
Cyclists from Friuli Venezia Giulia